(Walter) Archibald Elliott, Lord Elliott MC (6 September 1922 – 9 August 2008) was a Scottish lawyer and judge. In 1971, he became the first president of the newly established Lands Tribunal for Scotland, and in 1978 took on the additional office of chairman of the Scottish Land Court. Since then, both offices have been held concurrently.

Early life
Elliott was born in London into a prosperous family. His father was physician Thomas Renton Elliott who would later be appointed Professor of Medicine at University College London, while his mother came from the wealthy McCosh Lanarkshire Iron and Coal Company of Coatbridge. His parents lived in London's historic Cheyne Walk, Chelsea, and in Broughton Place, Scottish Borders, a tower house in the Scottish Baronial style designed by the then unknown Scottish architect Basil Spence in 1935, and completed in 1938. 

He was educated at Sandroyd School, then Eton and began studying history at Trinity College, Cambridge, but interrupted his studies to join the Army in 1943. After the War, he completed his studies at Cambridge before returning to Scotland, studying at the School of Law of the University of Edinburgh.

Military career
Elliott saw active service in the Second World War as an officer in the 2nd Battalion Scots Guards. He joined up in August 1943, and on 11 September that year led a platoon in an attack on a tobacco factory in Salerno. Captured by German troops, he escaped into the mountains and was awarded an immediate Military Cross for bravery. He later wrote two books based on his experiences: Us and Them: a study of group consciousness (1986), and Esprit de Corps (1996).

Legal career
On completing his studies at Edinburgh in 1950, Elliott was called to the Bar of England and Wales at the Inner Temple, and admitted to the Faculty of Advocates in Scotland. He took up practice in Scotland, and was appointed Queen's Counsel in 1963. In 1971, he was appointed a chairman of the Medical Appeal Tribunals, and as president of the newly established Lands Tribunal for Scotland. In 1978, he was appointed chairman of the Scottish Land Court, retaining his position as president of the Lands Tribunal. Since his retirement in 1992, the positions have always been held together. He was succeeded by Alexander Philip, Lord Philip.

Personal life
Elliott married Susan Isobel Mackenzie Ross in 1954, with whom he had two sons, Peter and Michael Elliott. He died on 9 August 2008.

References

1922 births
2008 deaths
People educated at Eton College
People educated at Sandroyd School
Alumni of Trinity College, Cambridge
Alumni of the University of Edinburgh
Scots Guards officers
Recipients of the Military Cross
Members of the Inner Temple
Members of the Faculty of Advocates
20th-century King's Counsel
Chairs of the Scottish Land Court
British Army personnel of World War II
Scottish autobiographers
British World War II prisoners of war
World War II prisoners of war held by Germany
British escapees
Escapees from German detention
Military personnel from London